Colonel Sir Horace Beauchamp Seymour KCH (22 November 1791 – 23 November 1851) was an English army officer and Tory politician.

Life
Horace Seymour was the son of Admiral Lord Hugh Seymour (son of Francis Seymour-Conway, 1st Marquess of Hertford) and Lady Anne Horatia Waldegrave. 

At the Battle of Waterloo, Seymour was aide-de-camp to the cavalry commander Lord Uxbridge and was reported to have killed more men at the battle than any other single individual. He carried the wounded Uxbridge from the battlefield, after he was hit by grapeshot from a cannon. Seymour later recalled that when hit Uxbridge cried out "I have got it at last," to which the Duke of Wellington replied "No? Have you, by God?"

Going into politics as a Peelite, Seymour was Member of Parliament for Lisburn 1819–1826, Orford (1820), Bodmin (1826–1832), Midhurst (1841–45), Antrim (1845–1847), and Lisburn again, 1847–1851.

Family
Seymour married, firstly, Elizabeth Malet Palk, daughter of Sir Lawrence Palk, 2nd Baronet and granddaughter of Sir Robert Palk, on 15 May 1818. He married, secondly, Frances Selina Isabella Poyntz, daughter of William Stephen Poyntz and Hon. Elizabeth Mary Browne, in July 1835. Frances was the widow of the 18th Baron Clinton and was a Lady of the Bedchamber to Queen Adelaide.

By his first wife he had three children;

 Lt.-Col. Charles Francis Seymour (13 September 1819 – 5 November 1854), killed at the Battle of Inkerman
 Frederick Beauchamp Paget Seymour, 1st Baron Alcester (12 April 1821 – 30 March 1895)
 Adelaide Horatia Elizabeth Seymour (27 January 1825 – 29 October 1877), who married Frederick Spencer, 4th Earl Spencer

Ancestry

References

External links 
 

1791 births
1851 deaths
Members of the Parliament of the United Kingdom for County Antrim constituencies (1801–1922)
Horace Beauchamp Seymour
Conservative Party (UK) MPs for English constituencies
Members of the Parliament of the United Kingdom for constituencies in Cornwall
Irish Conservative Party MPs
UK MPs 1818–1820
UK MPs 1820–1826
UK MPs 1826–1830
UK MPs 1830–1831
UK MPs 1831–1832
UK MPs 1841–1847
UK MPs 1847–1852